Song Haiwang (born 20 February 1995) is a Chinese footballer currently playing as a midfielder for Quanzhou Yassin on loan from Henan Jianye.

Club career
Song Haiwang was promoted to the senior team of Zhejiang Greentown within the 2016 Chinese Super League season and would make his debut in a Chinese FA Cup game on 12 May 2016 against Dalian Boyang F.C. in a 1-0 victory where he came on as a substitute for Luo Jing. Unfortunately Song would be part of the squad that saw Zhejiang get relegated at the end of the season. Within the lower level Song could not establish himself as a regular within the team and was allowed to leave the club to join top tier club Henan Jianye where he would make his debut on 19 August 2020 in a league game against Shandong Luneng Taishan F.C. in a 2-1 defeat.

Career statistics

References

External links

1995 births
Living people
Chinese footballers
China League One players
Chinese Super League players
Zhejiang Professional F.C. players
Henan Songshan Longmen F.C. players
Association football midfielders